Megacorma schroederi is a moth of the  family Sphingidae. It is known from Sulawesi in Indonesia.

References

Acherontiini
Moths described in 1999